Cameron Mann (April 3, 1851 - February 8, 1932) was the third bishop of North Dakota and the first bishop of South Florida in The Episcopal Church. He was the author of The Comments at the Cross: Six Lent Sermons.

Early life and education
Mann was born in New York City on April 3, 1851, the son of the Reverend Duncan Cameron Mann and Caroline Brother Schuyler. He was educated at Hobart College and earned his Bachelor of Arts in 1870 and a Master of Arts in 1974. He also studied at the General Theological Seminary, from where he graduated in 1873. He was awarded a Doctor of Divinity from Hobart in 1888, the General Seminary in 1902 and the University of the South in 1914. Rollins College awarded him with a Doctor of Laws in 1927.

Ordained ministry
Mann was ordained deacon in 1873 and became deacon-in-charge at St Luke's Church in Branchport, New York. In 1875, he became curate at St Peter's Church in Albany, New York. Between 1875 and 1882, he served as rector of St James' Church in Watkins Glen, New York. During that time, on November 11, 1876, he was ordained priest by Bishop Arthur Cleveland Coxe of Western New York. On June 14, 1882, he married Mary Le Cain of Cincinnati, and together had four children. That same year, he became rector of Grace Church in Kansas City, Missouri, and remained there through 1901.

Bishop
Mann was elected Missionary Bishop of North Dakota on October 2, 1901, during a General Convention held in San Francisco. He was consecrated on December 4, 1901, by Presiding Bishop Daniel S. Tuttle. In October 1913, he was elected Missionary Bishop of Southern Florida, while in 1922, with the creation of the Diocese of South Florida, he became the first diocesan bishop. He died in office on February 8, 1932, in Winter Park, Florida.

References

1851 births
1932 deaths
Clergy from New York City
Hobart and William Smith Colleges alumni
General Theological Seminary alumni
Episcopal bishops of North Dakota
Episcopal bishops of South Florida